TSV Grunbach is a German association football club from the town of Engelsbrand, Baden-Württemberg. The club's greatest success has been promotion to the tier five Oberliga Baden-Württemberg in 2012 but it withdrew from the league after only two seasons in 2014 despite finishing runners-up.

History
Formed in 1892 TSV Grunbach has played in local amateur football for the most part of its history. The club's rise through the league system began in 2008 with a championship in the Kreisklasse A2 Pforzheim. Three consecutive league titles from 2010 to 2012 took the club from the Kreisliga to the Oberliga Baden-Württemberg. In this league the club came thirteenth in its first season, followed by a runners-up finish in 2013–14. The latter would have allowed the club to participate in the promotion round to the Regionalliga Südwest but it declined because of the large expenses involved in modifying the stadium to Refionalliga standards. After merger talks with Verbandsliga club 1. CfR Pforzheim fell through and a cooperation was agreed on instead TSV Grunbach withdrew to the tier eight Kreisliga Pforzheim instead with a number of players being transferred from TSV to 1. CfR.

Honours
The club's honours:
 Oberliga Baden-Württemberg
 Champions: 2014
 Verbandsliga Baden
 Champions: 2012
 Landesliga Mittelbaden
 Champions: 2011
 Kreisliga Pforzheim
 Champions: 2010
 Kreisklasse A2 Pforzheim
 Champions: 2008

Recent seasons
The recent season-by-season performance of the club:

 With the introduction of the Regionalligas in 1994 and the 3. Liga in 2008 as the new third tier, below the 2. Bundesliga, all leagues below dropped one tier.

References

External links
Official team site
TSV Grunbach at Weltfussball.de

Football clubs in Germany
Football clubs in Baden-Württemberg
Association football clubs established in 1892
1892 establishments in Germany
Engelsbrand